The Marmontana is a mountain of the Lepontine Alps, located on the Swiss-Italian border.

The nearest respective human settlements are Brenzeglio in the Italian south, approximately 4500 horizontal meters from the summit, and Roveredo in the Swiss north, approximately 7750 horizontal metres from the summit. Other nearby locations include Dongo and Bellinzona. The mountain is in close proximity to 'Lago di Como' or "Lake Como".

References

External links
 Marmontana on Hikr

Mountains of the Alps
Mountains of Switzerland
Mountains of Lombardy
Italy–Switzerland border
International mountains of Europe
Mountains of Graubünden
Lepontine Alps
Two-thousanders of Switzerland
Roveredo